Bilingualism is the use of two languages, either by an individual speaker or by a community of speakers.

Bilingualism may also refer to:

 Bilingualism (neurology), the representation and effects of different language systems in the brain
 Bilingualism: Language and Cognition, a quarterly academic journal of linguistics

See also 
 
 Bilingual (disambiguation)